Provence (D652) is an Aquitaine-class frigate of the French Navy. The Aquitaine class were developed as part of the FREMM multipurpose frigate program.

Development and design 
In November 2005 France announced a contract of €3.5 billion for development and the first eight hulls, with options for nine more costing €2.95 billion split over two tranches (totaling 17).

Following the cancellation of the third and fourth of the s in 2005 on budget grounds, requirements for an air-defence derivative of the FREMM called FREDA were placed – with DCNS coming up with several proposals. Expectations were that the last two ships of the 17 FREMM planned would be built to FREDA specifications; however, by 2008 the plan was revised down to just 11 FREMM (9 ASW variants and 2 FREDA variants) at a cost of €8.75 billion (FY13, ~US$12 billion). The 11 ships would cost €670 million (~US$760m) each in FY2014, or €860m (~US$980m) including development costs. In 2015, the total number of ASW variants was further reduced to just six units, including Provence.

Construction and career 
Provence was developed as part of a joint Italian-French program known as FREMM, which was implemented to develop a new class of frigates for use by various European navies. Construction on the ship began in 2010 and was completed in 2015.

The Caiman Marine of the 33F flotilla embarked on Provence was able to show its ability to land on the American aircraft carrier.  

In March 2016, as part of Combined Task Force 150, the frigate made a major arms seizure off the coast of Somalia.

From 18 November to 2 December 2021, Provence took part in Exercise Polaris 21 in the western Mediterranean Sea. In October 2022, the frigate participated in joint exercises with the Croatian Navy in the Adriatic Sea.

Gallery

References 

2013 ships
Aquitaine-class frigates
Ships built in France